Buraco das Araras (GO-016) (English: Hole of the Macaws) is one of the largest quartzitic caves located in the State of Goiás, Brazil. It is considered one of the largest sinkholes (dolinas) in the world.

Description 
Discovered in 1912, it is believed that the hole has been formed by the collapse of the roof of a cave.

Getting there 
To reach it the traveler must travel  from Formosa, following BR-20 north as far as the village of Bezerra.

See also 
 List of caves in Brazil
 Gruta do Centenário
 Lapa Terra Ronca

References 

Caves of Goiás
Quartzite caves
Wild caves
Sinkholes of South America
Tourist attractions in Goiás